Mkhize is a surname. Notable people with the surname include:

Bertha Mkhize (1889–1981), South African teacher and businesswoman
Emmanuel Mkhize (born 1989), South African cricketer
Florence Mkhize (1932–1999), South African anti-apartheid activist
Linda Mkhize (1981–2018), South African rapper
Saul Mkhize (1935–1983), South African human rights activist
Thamsanqa Mkhize (born 1988), South African footballer
Zweli Mkhize (born 1956), South African doctor and ANC politician

See also
Florence Mkhize (patrol vessel), operated by South Africa

Bantu-language surnames